The Rotterdam Sportsman and Sportswoman of the Year is an annual election, organised by the city's division for topsport named Rotterdam Topsport. The award goes to sportspeople who were born or have lived in Rotterdam. Rotterdam was the first city in the Netherlands to honour its sportspeople for their achievements at the end of the year.

Winners

See also
 Dutch Sportsman of the year
 Amsterdam Sportsman of the year

References
 [www.rotterdamsportstadawards.nl Rotterdam Topsport]
 

Dutch sports trophies and awards
Awards established in 1986
1986 establishments in the Netherlands
Annual sporting events in the Netherlands
Events in Rotterdam
Sport in Rotterdam